Atrium Cinemas is a movie theater and first Digital 3D Multi-Screen Cinema Complex in Pakistan inside Atrium Mall Karachi. Cinema was opened on December 31, 2010.

References

External links 
 

Cinemas and movie theatres in Pakistan
2010 establishments in Pakistan
Cinema chains in Pakistan
Entertainment in Karachi